Häme road or Hot summer day is the most famous work of Werner Holmberg (1830–1860). It was painted in 1860. Though short, Holmberg's career helped develop Finnish landscape painting. He combined the traditional landscape painting techniques of the atelier with the modern outdoor en plein air landscape.

In the painting, a horse-drawn wagon is travelling along a rolling country road through a pine forest in Tavastia. The painting depicts the carriage from the rear on a hot day. Trees and vegetation are painted with accuracy and the perspective of the image from the fresh wheel marks in the dirt creates an impression of movement. One can almost smell the dust and pine needles under the wheels.

In 1853, Holmberg was the first Finnish artist to study in Düsseldorf. From the surviving sketches, it seems Holmberg's Road in Häme was probably painted in the Tampere region.

References

Sources 
 Anja Olavinen: Werner Holmberg: Maantie Hämeessä (Helteinen kesäpäivä). Teoksessa Ateneum-opas. Toim. Timo Huusko. 2007. s. 20.

External links 
 Maantie Hämeessä Suomen Kansallisgallerian  sivuilla

Landscape paintings
1860 paintings
Romanticism
Paintings in the collection of the Ateneum
Finnish paintings